"Full Cooperation" is a song by the American hip hop group Def Squad recorded for their sole album El Niño (1998). The song was released as the only single in promotion of the album on June 2, 1998. Each member's verse in the music video (directed by Steve Carr) is inspired by an Eddie Murphy film: Keith Murray's verse incorporates scenes from Another 48 Hrs., Erick Sermon's verse incorporates scenes from The Nutty Professor and Redman's verse incorporates scenes from Trading Places.

Track listing
12", Vinyl
"Full Cooperation" (Radio Edit) - 3:32
"Full Cooperation" (LP Version) - 3:28
"Full Cooperation" (TV track) - 3:27

Chart performance

Personnel
Information taken from Discogs.
mixing – Tommy Uzo
production – Erick Sermon
writing – Keith Murray, Reggie Noble, Harold Ousley

Notes

1998 singles
Keith Murray (rapper) songs
Redman (rapper) songs
Song recordings produced by Erick Sermon
Def Jam Recordings singles
1998 songs
Songs written by Redman (rapper)